Spacey Jane are an Australian indie rock band from Fremantle, which formed in 2016. The group consists of Ashton Hardman-Le Cornu (guitar), Caleb Harper (vocals, guitar), Kieran Lama (drums) and, since 2019, Peppa Lane (bass guitar). Their debut studio album, Sunlight, was released in 2020 and peaked at number two on the ARIA Charts. It was preceded by triple platinum single "Booster Seat", which peaked at number eight and won the ARIA Song of the Year. In 2020, their debut extended play No Way to Treat an Animal (2017) also peaked at number 23.

The band had four songs listed in the 2020 Triple J Hottest 100 with "Booster Seat" highest placed at number two. In the 2021 poll, certified platinum single "Lots of Nothing" appeared at number three. Their second studio album, Here Comes Everybody, was released in 2022 and debuted at number one on the ARIA Charts. Nominated for Best Rock Album at the ARIA Awards, the record became their second to top the Triple J Album Poll. Six of its tracks were voted into the Hottest 100 of 2022 making them the most played band of the countdown, with "Hardlight" highest placed at number three.

History

2016–2019: Formation and early releases

In 2016, Spacey Jane was formed in Fremantle, Perth, by Ashton Hardman-Le Cornu (guitar), Caleb Harper (vocals, guitar) Kieran Lama (drums), and Amelia Murray (bass guitar). Lama had been playing drums since he was 12 years old in Horsham, Victoria, before moving to Geraldton and meeting Harper in high school. Both played in a band Sicchino, with Lama meeting Le Cornu and Murray through university. The band name is derived from the name of one of the member's friends.

From 2016 to 2017, the band played one or two local shows "every week for a good year and a half". Their debut single, "Still Running", was released in August 2017, followed by tracks "Feeding the Family" and "Thrills" – the former receiving airtime on Perth radio station RTRFM. Their six-track debut extended play No Way to Treat an Animal was released independently in November 2017 containing all three singles. It peaked at number 23 on the ARIA Albums Chart in December 2020.

On 16 April 2018, Spacey Jane released a double A-sided single titled In the Meantime, featuring songs "Old Enough" and "So You Wanna". Hayden Davies of music publication Pilerats described "Old Enough" as "notably bright and summery, with light guitar riffs and a catchy bassline", while "So You Wanna" has a "somewhat brighter mood" than their EP's tracks, "with its light-hearted melodies and soaring vocals."

Spacey Jane's second EP, In the Slight, appeared on 9 November 2018 with five tracks. It provided two singles – "Cold Feet" on 17 August, and "Keep a Clean Nose" on 12 October. The record was described as a "meeting point of dreamy shoegaze and catchy indie pop" by Davies and was promoted with a launch party at Perth venue, Rosemount Hotel. After winning the Triple J Unearthed Falls competition, the band performed at Falls Festival 2018/2019.

The band's next single, "Good Grief", was released on 24 April 2019 and supported by their Good Grief Australian Tour. It was the first of six singles promoting their forthcoming debut studio album – the single was followed by "Good for You" (August) and "Head Cold" (November). The former was listed at number 80 in national youth radio station Triple J's annual listeners poll, Hottest 100 of 2019.

In July 2019 the group announced, via social media, that Murray was amicably leaving the band to focus on her medical career: her last show was on 13 July. She was replaced on bass guitar by Peppa Lane from Margaret River. She had studied at Western Australian Academy of Performing Arts and performed on double bass in her group, the Friendly Folk. Lane's second show with Spacey Jane was at Splendour in the Grass on 21 July. In a retrospective interview with Dylan De Jong of Horsham's Weekly Advertiser in 2021, Lama recalled "between 2016 and 2019 we toured nationally to crowds of 20 people", but that Splendour in the Grass and Brisbane's Bigsound festival in 2019 were "pivotal moments for the band" providing a "ridiculously upward trajectory". Spacey Jane signed a global deal with AWAL in December 2019.

2020–2021: Sunlight

The band performed at Laneway Festival on 2 February 2020, with their set broadcast on Triple J's Live at the Wireless later that month. Spacey Jane announced their debut studio album, Sunlight, was due on 12 June through AWAL. A fourth single, "Skin", was issued alongside the announcement, kicking off an Australian and New Zealand Tour (which was later postponed due to the COVID-19 pandemic).

"Straightfaced" (May) and "Booster Seat" (June) were released as the album's fifth and sixth singles. Upon the launch of Sunlight, Triple J named it their weekly feature album. Further, the band participated in the first round of Isol-Aid, a stay-at-home festival initiative to assist the Australian music industry during the pandemic. The band performed a 20-minute live set through a livestream on Instagram on 21 March 2020.

"Booster Seat" received critical acclaim from music publications. Al Newstead of Triple J called it a "life-affirming song with a platinum-strength sing-along quality", while alternative band Ocean Alley described the song as "a warm and nostalgic masterpiece with thoughtful storytelling and instrumentation to match". "Booster Seat" won Song of the Year at the 2021 ARIA Awards and Best Independent Song of the Year at the AIR Awards. By September 2022, the song was verified 3× platinum in Australia for the shipment of 210,000 copies.

Leading up to the Triple J Hottest 100 of 2020, multiple publications predicted that "Booster Seat" would top the list, with Josh Lesson of Northern Beaches Review writing it "is the one presenting the best chance of securing the first Australian Hottest 100 winner since Ocean Alley's 'Confidence' in 2018". In January 2021, "Booster Seat" polled at number two.

2021–present: Here Comes Everybody

In February 2021, the band signed to Lama's management company, Anybody Management. In June, they renewed their deal with AWAL, with marketing director Ben Godding stating that the label "firmly believe[d] [Spacey Jane] are now poised to break through on a global scale". Here Comes Everybodys lead single, "Lots of Nothing", was released on 24 June, followed by "Lunchtime" on 7 October and the announcement of a European tour for April 2022. Partnering with Apple Music on 23 August, the band released acoustic versions of "Lots of Nothing" and "Booster Seat", and covered Phoebe Bridgers' 2017 single "Scott Street" in Spacey Jane's Home Sessions EP. On 15 December 2021, it was announced Spacey Jane would contribute to the tribute double-album, ReWiggled, for children's music group the Wiggles, providing a cover version of "D.O.R.O.T.H.Y (My Favourite Dinosaur)".

"Lots of Nothing" and "Lunchtime" were listed in the Hottest 100 of 2021 at number three and number 12, respectively. In the same month, they announced their North American tour for May, however, these dates were postponed to October due to visa complications. In February 2022, the album's title was revealed, a third single, "Sitting Up", was released, alongside the announcement of an Australian tour for March. On 8 April, its fourth single "It's Been a Long Day" was released, followed by "Hardlight" (May) and "Pulling Through" (June). The album was originally slated for release on 10 June 2022, however it was postponed to 24 June due to vinyl production delays. After its launch, the record debuted at number one on the ARIA Charts. 

The band embarked on their Here Comes Everybody Tour in August 2022. On 17 August, the band released their second double A-side as part of the Spotify Singles program; they had recorded an acoustic version of "Hardlight" as well as a cover version of Paramore's 2010 single "The Only Exception".

In the Triple J Hottest 100 of 2022, the band scored six tracks in the countdown, including three songs in the top 10 – a feat only achieved three other times in the countdown's history (most recently, Gang of Youths in 2017). The band also became the eighth artist ever to have two songs poll in the top 5. "Hardlight" was the highest-placing at number three, followed by "It's Been a Long Day" and "Sitting Up" at number five and six respectively.

Artistry

Spacey Jane's Harper cites Wilco, early Kings of Leon, Courtney Barnett, the Strokes and Pixies as musical influences. He stated his inspirations for lyrics comes from "processing emotions and life experiences" and "music as a means of catharsis". The band have said that they "aim to make music which resonates with people", and "focus on the sense of connection that music brings". Their musical foundations are indie rock and garage rock. Their earliest singles and debut EP "integrated a bold indie pop sound with their own raw Australian top coat... Packed full of pulsating rhythm and dirty guitars." All the tracks on No Way to Treat an Animal were co-written by Hardman-Le Cornu, Harper and Lama. By 2018 their sound provided a "brighter mood" and "light-hearted melodies" with "soaring vocals". In the Slight developed a "dreamy shoegaze" intersection with their "catchy indie pop". By the end of that year the group had "expanded their horizons and toyed with what's expected of an Australian garage-rock band."

Sunlights first three singles "Good Grief", "Good for You" and "Head Cold" were all written before Lane joined the group. According to Ali Shutler of NME Australia the album includes "festival-ready songs that embrace a freewheeling joy... But there’s more to this record than purely chasing the roar of a crowd." Overall "All the jagged edges of conflicting genres are somehow smoothed out under their command and there's not a moment of their ambitious vision that feels uncomfortable."

Here Comes Everybody was noted for its stark sonic departure from the album's predecessor, and praised by some outlets for proving development in the band's sound. Caleb Triscari of NME wrote the album dives "head-first into something the band didn’t explore too much in Sunlight: dreary music for their equally dreary lyrics", particularly referring to tracks "Clean My Car" and "It's Been a Long Day" which "dial down the tempo a little in order to truly embody the deadening feelings they’re about". While this change of pace was controversial, with Shaad D'Souza of the Guardian writing "most of the songs here hit the same beats over and over", and Al Newstead of Triple J noting it "mostly sticks closely to the model established on Sunlight", Here Comes Everybody was praised for Harper's "fuller use of his vocal range" and "new instrumentation" to combat "their reliance on a verse-chorus structure".

Tours

Nationwide and regional 

 In the Slight Australian Tour – Australia (2019)
 Good Grief Tour – Australia (2019)
 Spacey Jane Australia Tour – Australia (2019)
 Head Cold Tour – Australia (2019)
 Back on the Road – Western Australia (2020)
 Spacey Jane with Special Guests – Western Australia (2020)
 Sunlight Australia Tour – Australia (2021)
 Spacey Jane Australia – Australia (2022)  
 Regional Australia Tour – Australia (2023)

International 
 Spacey Jane UK Tour – UK (2020)
 Skin AU/NZ Tour – Australia, New Zealand (2020)
 Spacey Jane UK/EU Tour – Europe (2022)
 Here Comes Everybody Tour – Australia, New Zealand, Europe, North America (2022–2023)

Band members
Current members

 Ashton Hardman-Le Cornu – lead guitar 
 Caleb Harper – lead vocals, rhythm guitar 
 Kieran Lama – drums 
 Peppa Lane – bass guitar, backing vocals 

Past members
 Amelia Murray – bass guitar, backing vocals

Discography

Studio albums

Extended plays

Double A-sides

Singles

Other appearances

Music videos

Awards and nominations

AIR Awards
The Australian Independent Record Awards (commonly known informally as AIR Awards) is an annual awards night to recognise, promote and celebrate the success of Australia's Independent Music sector.

APRA Awards
The APRA Awards have been presented annually since 1982 and are organised by the Australasian Performing Right Association (APRA), "honouring composers and songwriters".

ARIA Music Awards
The ARIA Music Awards is an annual awards ceremony that recognises excellence, innovation, and achievement across all genres of Australian music. They commenced in 1987 and are organised by the Australian Recording Industry Association (ARIA).

J Awards
The J Awards are an annual series of Australian music awards that were established by the Australian Broadcasting Corporation's youth-focused radio station Triple J. They commenced in 2005.

Rolling Stone Australia Awards
The Rolling Stone Australia Awards are awarded annually in January or February by the Australian edition of Rolling Stone magazine for outstanding contributions to popular culture in the previous year.

West Australian Music Industry Awards
The West Australian Music Industry Awards (WAMIs) are annual awards presented to the local contemporary music industry, presented annually by the Western Australian Music Industry Association Inc (WAM).

Triple J Hottest 100 and 200 Performance 
Spacey Jane have featured in every Triple J Hottest 100 countdown since 2019. Their triple platinum single "Booster Seat" was considered a favourite to top the poll in 2020, but it placed second to "Heat Waves" by Glass Animals. Notably, in the 2022 countdown, Spacey Jane had the most songs featured in the top 100 with six tracks, equaling a record by Wolfmother from 2005. They held three tracks in the top 10 alone, a feat only previously achieved three times before – most recently, by Gang of Youths in 2017.

References

External links
 
 

2016 establishments in Australia
ARIA Award winners
Australian indie pop groups
Australian indie rock groups
Australian rock music groups
AWAL artists
Musical quartets
Musical groups established in 2016
Western Australian musical groups